Orland Square (also referred to as Orland Square Mall) is a shopping mall located in Orland Park, Illinois. It opened on March 15, 1976 and received major renovations in 1995. Its anchor stores are JCPenney, Macy's and Von Maur. It also has two restaurants, Cheesecake Factory and Texas de Brazil.

The mall has been a hub for commercial activity and development, driving dramatic growth in the surrounding area for the past 20 years.  It serves as a major retail destination for the communities of Frankfort, Homer Glen, Mokena, New Lenox, Oak Forest, Orland Hills, Orland Park, and Tinley Park.

History
Orland Square opened on March 15, 1976 with JCPenney, Marshall Field's, Sears and Carson's.

In 1989, Ruby Tuesday would open on the upper level by Marshall Field's.

On July 21, 1994, a fire destroyed the Buy The Weigh candy store. The next year, Orland Square would undergo a remodel.

On September 12, 2002, Hot Topic, which is located near JCPenney, opened to customers, six days before Woodfield Mall in Schaumburg opened. In 2006, Macy's took control of the Marshall Field's location upon being purchased from Federated Department Stores and May Company. 

H&M opened in the Sears wing on November 12, 2004.

Half Price Books opened outside the mall on May 13, 2010. After 22 years of operation, Ruby Tuesday would officially close in December 2011.

Orland Square went under another renovation in 2012 that completely changed the image of the mall, with upgraded entrances, signs, floors, as well as lighting and expanded food court. Dave & Buster's opened a stand-alone location in the mall parking lot near the former Toys "R" Us in September 2012. On December 5, 2012, Cheesecake Factory officially opened on the lower level by Macy's. In January 2013, Gap was introduced at the mall by Sears. On November 4, 2016, an entertainment center called Gizmo's Fun Factory opened along with Sky Zone Trampoline Park to the left of the nearby Carson's Furniture Gallery.

In January 2018, Sears announced the closure of 103 locations, including Orland Square. The store closed on April 8, 2018 and is planned to be redeveloped into an AMC Theatres and new retail. The mall was one of 235 properties Sears Holdings spun off into Seritage Growth Properties in 2015. There was a Movie Theater outside Of Orland Square Mall called Orland Square Cinemas which opened on June 17, 1977. On December 16, 1983, four more screens were added near Wolf Camera. The theater operated until Marcus Cinemas Orland Park Cinema opened in 1995. The original theater eventually closed down in the late 1990s. The later addition was shuttered a short time thereafter and eventually demolished to make way for the Robert Morris College Tech Center.

On April 18, 2018, The Bon-Ton announced that all locations would close permanently, including the Orland Park Carson's and its Furniture Gallery. The Carson's anchor along with its Furniture Gallery closed on August 29, 2018.

On January 21, 2019, a shooting occurred in the mall which left one person dead and one person wounded. At approximately 6:45 p.m. CST, 19-year-old Jakharr Williams opened fire near the food court. 18-year-old Javon Britton was killed, while a bystander was grazed during the gunfire. Williams was arrested by police two days after the shooting in Matteson, Illinois.

Von Maur opened to the public in the former spot of the Carson's anchor store on November 2, 2019, a month after Woodland Mall in Kentwood, Michigan opened. The same year Von Maur opened, Texas de Brazil would officially open on the upper level by the defunct Sears.

On August 20, 2020, Duluth Trading Company opened to the left of Half Price Books.

Bus routes 
Pace

 364 159th Street  
 379 Midway/Orland Park  
 832 Joliet/Orland Square

See also
 Cooper's Hawk Winery & Restaurants
 Parkview Christian Church

References

External links
 

Simon Property Group
Shopping malls in Cook County, Illinois
Shopping malls established in 1976
Orland Park, Illinois
1976 establishments in Illinois
Shopping malls in Illinois